Live at Abbey Road may refer to:

 Live at Abbey Road, a 1982 live album by The Shadows
 Live at Abbey Road Studios 2004, a live album by Tim Christensen

See also
Live from Abbey Road, a British performance/documentary television series